Diamella arrowi is a species of ground beetle in the Lebiinae subfamily that is endemic to the Philippines.

References

Beetles described in 1935
Beetles of Asia
Endemic fauna of the Philippines